Conasprella somalica is a species of sea snail, a marine gastropod mollusk in the family Conidae, the cone snails and their allies.

Description
The size of the shell attains 23 mm.

Distribution
This marine species occurs off Somalia.

References

  Puillandre N., Duda T.F., Meyer C., Olivera B.M. & Bouchet P. (2015). One, four or 100 genera? A new classification of the cone snails. Journal of Molluscan Studies. 81: 1-23

External links
 To World Register of Marine Species
 
 Specimen at MNHN, Paris

Endemic fauna of Somalia
somalica
Gastropods described in 2013